The 2003 Arkansas State Indians football team represented Arkansas State University as a member of the Sun Belt Conference the 2003 NCAA Division I-A football season. Led by second-year head coach Steve Roberts, the Indians compiled an overall record of 5–7 with a mark of 3–3 in conference play, placing in a three-way tie for third in the Sun Belt.

Schedule

References

Arkansas State
Arkansas State Red Wolves football seasons
Arkansas State Indians football